The 1961 Miami Redskins football team was an American football team that represented Miami University in the Mid-American Conference (MAC) during the 1961 NCAA University Division football season. In its sixth season under head coach John Pont, Miami compiled a 6–4 record (3–2 against MAC opponents), finished in third place in the MAC, held six of ten opponents to six or fewer points, and outscored all opponents by a combined total of 153 to 115.

Joe Galat and Bill Triplett were the team captains. Triplett, who led the team with 648 rushing yards, received the team's most valuable player award. Other statistical leaders included Jack Gayheart with 551 passing yards and Bob Jencks with 359 receiving yards (including 143 receiving yards against Ohio) and 50 points scored (five touchdowns, 13 extra points, and two field goals).

Schedule

References

Miami
Miami RedHawks football seasons
Miami Redskins football